Dizrythmia (1977) is the third studio album released by New Zealand new wave band Split Enz. It was the first Split Enz album without co-founding members Phil Judd and Mike Chunn. Neil Finn and Nigel Griggs, the first being the younger brother of band leader Tim Finn, replaced them respectively. Meanwhile, Nigel's old friend and former bandmate Malcolm Green took the place of Emlyn Crowther, who also left around this time. The album was released domestically by Mushroom Records, and overseas by Chrysalis Records.

The single "My Mistake" was a hit in New Zealand and Australia, but failed to make much impact overseas. "Bold as Brass" was the second single. The album is regarded as the start of the band's breakthrough, and marked a shift from art rock to more pop-oriented songs.

The album's title comes from circadian dysrhythmia, more commonly known as jet lag.

The back cover was originally intended as the front cover. Both were designed by Noel Crombie, who also designed the band's costumes.

Tim Finn coughs forty-four seconds into "Nice to Know", a feature erroneously left in the final mix.

Both Tim Finn and Eddie Rayner were disappointed with the final mix of "Charlie", feeling that the vocals sounded very flat. Geoff Emerick, the engineer for the album, thought it was a beautiful vocal, however, so it stayed.

Track listing

* Spelt "Charley" on some releases.

Personnel

Split Enz
Original album
 Timothy Finn – vocals, acoustic guitar, piano
 Neil Finn – vocals, guitars, mandolin
 Edward Rayner – keyboards
 Noel Crombie –  vocals, percussion (not credited on sleeve on 2006 remaster)
 Robert Gillies – saxophones, trumpet
 Malcolm Green – drums
 Nigel Griggs – bass
"Another Great Divide" (bonus track on 2006 re-release)
 Timothy Finn – vocals, piano
 Edward Rayner – keyboards
 Noel Crombie – percussion
 Robert Gillies – saxophone
 Phil Judd – vocals, guitar 
 Mike Chunn – vocals, bass
 Emlyn Crowther - drums

Additional musician
 Mal Jacobson – sonor drums and percussion
 All arrangements by Split Enz
 Remastered by Eddie Rayner and Adrian Stuckey at Bignote Studios, Australia, March/April 2006

Charts

Weekly charts

Year-end charts

Certifications and sales

References

1977 albums
Split Enz albums
Chrysalis Records albums
Mushroom Records albums
Albums produced by Geoff Emerick